The SVD, GRAU index 6V1, is a semi-automatic marksman rifle chambered in  the fully-powered 7.62×54mmR cartridge, developed in the Soviet Union. The SVD was designed to serve a squad support role to provide precise long-range engagement capabilities to ordinary troops following the Warsaw Pact adoption of the 7.62×39mm intermediate cartridge and assault rifles as standard infantry weapon systems. At the time, NATO used battle rifles chambered in 7.62×51mm NATO as standard infantry weapon systems and had not yet adopted an intermediate cartridge and assault rifle of their own, allowing them to outrange their Warsaw Pact counterparts.

It was developed through 1958–1963 and selected as the winner of a contest that included three competing groups of designers, led by Sergei Simonov (prototype rejected in April 1960), Aleksandr Konstantinov, and Yevgeny Dragunov. Extensive field testing of the rifles conducted in a wide range of environmental conditions (Konstantinov's competing 2B-W-10 prototype was simpler and cheaper but tested less accurate, durable and reliable) resulted in Dragunov's proposal being accepted into service in July 1963. An initial pre-production batch consisting of 200 rifles was assembled for evaluation purposes, and from 1964 serial production was carried out by Izhmash, later called Kalashnikov Concern.

Since then, the SVD has become the standard squad support weapon of several countries, including those of the former Warsaw Pact. China produced a copy of the SVD through reverse-engineered samples captured during the Sino-Vietnamese War as the Type 79 and 85. Iran also produced a clone, the Nakhjir 3, which was a direct copy of the Chinese Type 79.

Design
The SVD bears a number of cosmetic similarities to the AK family of rifles but these similarities are for the purpose of standardizing manual of arms. This has occasionally lead to misidentification of the SVD as an AK variant, and vice versa.

Operating Mechanism 
The barrel breech is locked through a rotating bolt (left rotation) and uses three locking lugs to engage corresponding locking recesses in the barrel extension. The rifle has a hammer-type striking mechanism and a manual lever safety selector. In addition to the trigger disconnect, the fire control mechanism has a second disconnector which does not allow the hammer to fall until the bolt has been closed, similar to a sear in a select-fire weapon. However, the SVD was only designed for semi-automatic fire. The firing pin in the SVD is not retained, i.e. "free-floating", and it is therefore possible for accidental discharge to occur as the bolt pushes an unfired cartridge into the chamber, should there be an obstruction in the firing pin channel resulting from poor maintenance or extreme cold. 

The firearm is operated by a short-stroke gas piston system with a two-position gas regulator. The gas regulator can be set with the help of the rim of a cartridge. Position #1 leaves a gas escape port opened, whereas position #2 closes the gas escape port and directs extra gas to the piston, increasing the recoil velocity of the gas-piston system and is used for resolving reliability issues which arise from fouling in the gas port/action, extreme cold, high altitude, or using under-powered ammunition.

The rifle is fed from a detachable curved box magazine with a 10-round capacity and the cartridges are double-stacked in a  staggered zigzag pattern. After discharging the last cartridge from the magazine, the bolt carrier and bolt are held back on a bolt catch that is released by pulling the cocking handle to the rear. 

The rifle's receiver is machined to improve precision by adding torsional strength.

Barrel 
The barrel profile is relatively thin to save weight. Its bore is chrome-lined for increased corrosion resistance and features four right-hand grooves. Originally, the twist rate was 320 mm (1:12.6 in), as it had been designed for use with heavier civilian ammunition. In 1975 the twist rate was increased to the standard 240 mm (1:9.4 in), which reduced the precision with the 7N1 sniper cartridge by 19% but allowed for the use of standard "light" ball steel core LPS Gzh (57-N-323S), as well as its variations (incendiary, tracer, armor-piercing) with acceptable precision. The front part of the barrel features the front sight assembly and a bayonet lug. The muzzle is equipped with a permanently affixed long-slotted flash hider.

In order to pass inspections at the factory, these rifles must not produce more than a 0.7 MOA median deviation from the expected point of impact in three 10-shot groups using 7N1 (approximately 3 MOA).

Ammunition 
To enable the desired precision of the SVD, new "sniper" ammunition, designated 7N1, was designed by V. M. Sabelnikov, P. P. Sazonov and V. M. Dvorianinov in 1966 to meet the new standards. 7N1 sniper cartridges should not produce more than 1.24 MOA extreme vertical spread with 240 mm twist rate barrels and no more than 1.04 MOA extreme vertical spread with 320 mm twist rate barrels in a 5-shot group. The precision requirements demanded of the SVD with 7N1 is similar to the American M24 Sniper Weapon System with M118SB cartridges (1.18 MOA extreme vertical spread) and the M110 Semi-Automatic Sniper System with M118LR ammunition (1.27 MOA extreme vertical spread).

7N1 differed from the standard LPS Gzh (57-N-323S) cartridge in its use of finely extruded propellant and a modified projectile containing a void inside of the jacket at the tip which improved terminal ballistics and a bimetal lead and mild steel core. With standard 57-N-323S cartridges, the precision of the SVD is reduced to 2.21 MOA extreme vertical spread. This ammunition was later replaced by 7N14 in 1999, which replaced the mild steel penetrator with a hardened steel penetrator in response to the development of infantry body armor.

Sights 

The iron sights can be used with or without the standard issue optical sight in place. This is possible because the scope mount does not block the area between the front and rear sights.

The SVD was originally issued with a detachable PSO-1 optical sight (now PSO-1M2) which mounts to a Warsaw Pact rail on the left side of the receiver. 
The BDC feature must be tuned at the factory for the particular ballistic trajectory of a particular combination of rifle and cartridge at a predefined air density. With increasing range, inevitable BDC-induced errors will occur when the environmental and meteorological circumstances deviate from the predefined circumstances for which the BDC was calibrated. Marksmen can be trained to understand the main forces acting on the projectile and their effect on their particular gun and ammunition, and the effects of external factors at longer ranges to counter these errors.

Several military issue alternative telescopic sights with varying levels of magnification and reticles are available for the SVD. Rifles designated SVDN come equipped with a night sight, such as the NSP-3, NSPU, PGN-1, NSPUM or the Polish passive PCS-5. Rifles designated SVDN-1 can use the passive night sight NSPU-3 (1PN51) and rifles designated SVDN2 can use the passive night sight NSPUM (1PN58).

Commercial non military issue mounts that attach to the Warsaw Pact rail mount can allow use of Picatinny rail-mounted optics.

Stock 
The original SVD had a birch plywood laminate two-piece handguard/gas tube cover and a skeletonized thumbhole stock equipped with a detachable cheek rest; the latter is removed when using iron sights. Beginning in the 80's, wooden parts were replaced with synthetic parts made of a black polymer – the handguard and gas tube cover are more or less identical in appearance, while the thumbhole stock is of a different shape.

Accessories 
A number of accessories are issued with the rifle, including a blade-type bayonet (AKM clipped point or the AK-74 spear point bayonet), four spare magazines, a leather or nylon sling, magazine pouch, cleaning kit and an accessory/maintenance kit for the telescopic sight. Also included is a cold weather battery case with a "shirt clip", with a permanently attached cord [approximately 24" long] ending with another battery case cap that has an extension to press against the internal contact in lieu of the battery to complete the circuit. Placing the external battery case into the shooters' clothing close to the body keeps it from freezing; using the clip ensures it remains in place. The clamp-style bipod attaches to machined-out reliefs near the front of the receiver, it literally grabs the two cut out areas and securely mounts with a large round sized head on the clamp bolt able to tightly attach the bipod. The legs are individually adjustable [as opposed to fixed length found on many rifles and LMG's] and can be folded and stowed in a forward position negating the need to remove the bipod before placing the rifle into the canvas carrying case. The two legs are held close together with a "J" shaped clamp attached to one leg and swung over the other leg. Original Soviet/Russian SVD bipods fetch a very high price when they rarely appear on the market.

Variants

SSV-58 – The prototype submitted to trials by Dragunov. The design lacked the fixed flash hider and bayonet lug which was added to the rifle prior to adoption. The rear sights were mounted to the dust cover and were aperture sights instead of the standard notch sight. SVDN (6V1N) – A series of variants of the original SVD which were issued with various night vision optics. 

V-70 – A prototype automatic rifle developed in 1968. It involved the development of a new bipod, a thicker and shorter barrel with a new muzzle device, and 15/20-round magazines. The detachable bipod designed for this project would be used in subsequent models of SVD. 

Tiger – A civilian variant of the SVD, lacking a bayonet lug, first produced in the 1970s. Serial production for began in 1992. For export into the United States, the sear which prevented out-of-battery discharge had to be removed to comply with the National Firearms Act. As of the writing of this article, Tiger rifles are available with shortened (520 mm) and full length (620 mm) barrels, different stocks (including an SVDS-style folding stock), and are chambered in 7.62×54mmR, .308 Winchester, .30-06 Springfield or 9.3×64mm Brenneke.

AF – A prototype automatic rifle developed in the mid 70's. The prototypes were chambered in 5.45x39mm and made compatible with AK-74 magazines (specifically, the 45-round magazine also compatible with the RPK-74). 

SVD-S (6V3) – Attempts to reduce the length of the rifle for use by marines, mechanized infantry, and paratroopers began in 1978 by adding a folding buttstock and a separate pistol grip. Initially, preexisting stock designs were used (such as the one from the AKS-74), but ergonomic problems necessitated the design of a unique folding stock. The final design was chosen out of a variety of prototypes and adopted in 1995, which had a metal stock which folded to the right as to not be interfered by the optic mount and also had a shortened barrel. The stock included a rubber shoulder pad and cheek riser. The barrel was also given a heavier profile, the receiver housing was strengthened, the gas cylinder block was improved and a ported, and a shorter conical flash suppressor was adopted. The SVDSN (6V3N) variants, much like the SVDN variants, are simply equipped with various night vision devices.  SVDG (6V1-10) – A smoothbore SVD with a 10mm bore developed alongside the modern intermediate cartridge program to use the experimental 3 mm APFSDS projectile, originally designed for use in standard machine guns. The design was not implemented due to the poor terminal ballistics of the projectile and the complexity of the new weapon. 

Type 79/85 – A Chinese variant of the SVD. Although the design is nearly identical to the original SVD, some parts are not interchangeable, as the dimensions are slightly different from Soviet production rifles. A small quantity were also chambered in .308 winchester for export. Exported rifles are often referred to as the NDM-86 or EM-351.

Al-Kadesih – An Iraqi variant of the SVD, not to be confused with the Tabuk rifle. Although the design is very similar to the SVD, many parts are not interchangeable due to its unique dimensions and design characteristics. For example, the receiver is not milled and is slightly longer than that of the SVD, and the barrel is pinned to the receiver instead of being threaded. The rifle is also issued magazines with an ornamental palm tree relief. 

TKB-0172 – An early bullpup design of the SVD developed by the Tula Sporting and Hunting Weapons Design Bureau in the 80's. This rifle also had a significantly shortened barrel to reduce length. 

SSV-6 (6V1-6) – Chambered in the experimental 6mm cartridge developed in the 80's. The weapon was not adopted due to the poor effectiveness of the cartridge. 

OTs-03 SVU – A variant of the TKB-0172 which began serial production in 1991 for the MVD. The rifle was also equipped with an improved muzzle brake as well as a rear aperture sight, much like the original SVD prototype. Many were not new production rifles, but instead, retrofitted SVDs. A select-fire variant (OTs-03A(S) SVU-A) was also produced in small quantities to serve as an automatic rifle, but the automatic fire capability was later removed from the design. The original shortened barrel was also later replaced with a full-length barrel in the design. 

SVDK (6V9) – An experimental Russian variant chambered for the 9.3×64mm 7N33 cartridge, based on the civilian Tigr design. 

SWD-M – A modernized Polish variant of the SVD adopted in 1998 which uses a heavy barrel, bipod (mounted to the forearm) and LD-6 (6×42) telescopic sight.

CS/LR19 or NSG-85 – A modernized Chinese variant of the Type 85 adopted by the PLA in 2014

SVDM – A modernized variant of the SVDS which entered service in 2018. Compared to its predecessor, the SVDM was notably designed with a thicker (and 550 mm long) barrel, new furniture, and a picatinny rail mount on the new, hinged, dust cover. The variable power 1P88-4 (1П88-4) telescopic sight is used as the standard day optic. The SVDM rifle can be used with a detachable bipod, and with a quick-detachable suppressor. The iron sight line features a simplified rear sight element and a new front sight element located above the gas block.

Doctrine
The SVD was used by designated marksmen deployed in the Soviet Army at the basic motorized infantry rifle platoon level. For this purpose, the rifle was designed to be much lighter than more conventional precision rifles, making it better suited for use by infantry, and the rifle is autoloading in order to prioritize volume of fire over precision. It was thought that a relatively small number of marksmen armed with 7.62×54mmR fully powered cartridge chambered arms could assist conventional troops armed with 7.62×39mm intermediate cartridge chambered arms by suppressing/harassing valuable targets and assets (such as officers, radio operators, vehicle crews, other marksmen, machine gun teams, anti-tank warfare teams, etc.) with greater precision and at much greater ranges.

Once the rifle had been produced in sufficient numbers, every infantry platoon of Warsaw Pact troops included at least one SVD-equipped marksman. In the German Democratic Republic arsenals, there were almost 2,000. The marksmen were often chosen from personnel who displayed exceptional rifle marksmanship while members of DOSAAF. To attain this level of accuracy the sniper could not engage more than two such targets per minute. For distances not exceeding  the probability was estimated to be well above 90% regardless of time taken.

Users

: used by the Afghan National Army and Taliban 

: Uses Chinese Type 85 variant.

: Type 79 variant in use.
 : Burundian special forces 

 : SVD and Type 85
: Norinco-made copy of the SVD, known as the Type 79. Equipped with a 4× magnification optical sight which is a copy of the PSO-1. The rifle has a slightly shorter butt. Also produced a modified Type 85 and several other commercial copies of the SVD. An upgraded variant called the CS/LR19 was also debuted. Export variants such as the "NSG-85" were also produced.

: Used by "Designated Marksmen". Being phased out in favour of newer systems.
: Locally produced as the Nakhjir 3 Sniper Rifle.  A new upgraded version was unveiled during the Muhammad Rasulullah 4 exercises held on 12 December 2016.
: Al Kadesiah, made based on SVD and PSL. Official Iraqi designation is either Al-Qadissiya or Al-Gadissiya. SVD and Kadesiah rifles has been used by both Saddam's and post-2003 Iraqi Army and by Iraqi insurgents. SVDs are also fielded by the Popular Mobilization Forces.
 
 : SVD and Type 79
 

 
 

  Lord Resistance Army

: Including Type 85s

: Formerly used by the defunct Panama Defense Forces.
: Type 85 Chinese variant. Also batches of SVD rifle donated by Russia.
: Polish SVD modernization; known as SWD-M- and updated with a heavier barrel, variable magnification scope and detachable bipod. It's planned to replace SVD with the marksman variant of the FB MSBS Grot.
: SVD-M and folding-stock SVDS.
: Used by Air Force and Army
 Special forces, model SVDK.

 

: Used by Gendarmerie General Command and Polis Özel Harekat.

: Over 1000 rifles purchased by the Army of Venezuela in 2007.
: Used by the Vietnamese Army since the Vietnam War.

Former users
: Issued as the SWD.
 Chechen Republic of Ichkeria
: Entered service with the Czechoslovak Army in the 1970's.
: Entered service with the Soviet Army in 1967.

Conflicts
Vietnam War
Sino-Vietnamese War
Soviet–Afghan War
Lebanese Civil War
1982 Lebanon War
South Lebanon conflict (1985–2000)
Iran–Iraq War
First Nagorno-Karabakh War
Gulf War
Salvadoran Civil War
Operation Restore Hope
South African Border War
Burundian Civil War
War in Afghanistan (2001–2021)
Iraq War
Yugoslav Wars
First Chechen War	
Second Chechen War
2011 Libyan Civil War
Northern Mali conflict
Syrian Civil War
Boko Haram insurgency
Iraqi Civil War (2014–2017)
Russo-Ukrainian War
Yemeni Civil War (2015–present)
Saudi–Yemeni border conflict (2015–present)
2022 Russia-Ukraine war

See also
SVDK a variant of the SVD, chambered in 9.3×64mm Brenneke.
VSS Vintorez, a suppressed sniper rifle also used in limited numbers in Russia, similar weapon.
Puşca Semiautomată cu Lunetă (PSL), a Romanian designated marksman/sniper rifle that resembles the SVD, chambered in 7.62×54mmR.
Zastava M76, a Yugoslavian designated marksman/sniper rifle that resembles the SVD, chambered in 7.92×57mm Mauser.
Zastava M91, a Serbian designated marksman/sniper rifle that resembles the SVD, chambered in 7.62×54mmR.
IMI Galatz, an Israeli designated marksman/sniper rifle that resembles the SVD, chambered in 7.62×51mm NATO.

References

External links

IZHMASH JSC official site: 7.62 mm Dragunov Sniper Rifle "SVD"

7.62×54mmR semi-automatic rifles
Cold War firearms of the Soviet Union
Designated marksman rifles
Infantry weapons of the Cold War
Rifles of the Cold War
Sniper rifles of the Soviet Union
Semi-automatic rifles of the Soviet Union
Sniper rifles of Russia
Short stroke piston firearms
Izhevsk machine-building plant products
Weapons and ammunition introduced in 1963